Arnold II of Isenburg ( – 1259) was Archbishop of Trier from 1242 to his death. A long-time member of the cathedral chapter in Trier, he held several provostships before being elected as archbishop, succeeding his uncle Theoderich von Wied. The election was controversial, and king Conrad IV of Germany granted the regalia to Rudolf de Ponte, the opposing candidate, instead. Arnold was confirmed as archbishop by Pope Innocent IV and consecrated in 1245.

Arnold opposed Conrad and the Hohenstaufen claim to the throne, and elected Henry Raspe and later William II of Holland as German kings. During his reign, he fortified several towns and built various castles. He died in Montabaur in early November 1259 and is buried in Trier Cathedral.

Early life and career 

Arnold was born . His cousin was Siegfried III, archbishop of Mainz; another likely relative was Konrad von Hochstaden, archbishop of Cologne. Arnold was likely educated at the cathedral school in Cologne and spoke Italian. Before , he became a member of the cathedral chapter in Trier, where he was cellarer from 1212. Arnold became archdeacon of St. Lubentius in Dietkirchen in 1217 and cathedral provost in 1228.

Election as archbishop 
In 1242, the Hohenstaufen king Conrad IV of Germany, son of Emperor Frederick II, Holy Roman Emperor, visited Trier during Lent. At this time, the archbishops of Mainz and Cologne were no longer loyal to the Hohenstaufen dynasty, but Theoderich of Wied still supported the Emperor. When a soldier attempted to seize Siegfried von Honeck, a supporter of the archbishop of Mainz, in Arnold's house, Honeck killed the soldier. A tumult ensued, and Arnold retreated into the episcopal palace. Theoderich died on 28 March 1242 and Arnold was elected as his successor by the cathedral chapter. This was the first episcopal election in Trier where only the cathedral chapter could vote, in contrast to previous elections where other nobility and clerics had been involved. Parties opposed to Arnold chose the St Paulin provost, Rudolf de Ponte, as the new archbishop. Conrad then granted the regalia to Rudolf. After a short civil war, in which some counts and dukes including Henry V, Count of Luxembourg fought against Arnold, Rudolf gave up his claim and settled for his previous provostship. He died soon after, which ended the conflict.

Archbishop of Trier 

Together with his colleagues from Cologne and Mainz, Arnold elected Henry Raspe as anti-king of Germany on 22 May 1246. After Henry's death, the archbishops elected William II of Holland as his successor in 1247. Arnold supported William from 1249, allowing him the use of his fortress at Ehrenbreitstein. He was with William's armies at Mainz in a confrontation with Conrad IV in 1250, and accompanied him to see Pope Innocent IV in Lyon at Easter 1251. 

In the 1257 Imperial election, Arnold elected Alfonso X of Castile, while the other archbishops elected Richard of Cornwall. This also led to military conflict with the Archbishop of Mainz, with the Trier troops defeated by Mainz at Boppard in May 1257.

During his reign, Arnold tried to increase the power of the archbishop, and built fortifications at Trier, Münstermaifeld, Koblenz and Hartenfels as well as castles including Bischofstein Castle and Stolzenfels Castle. His favourite residence was at Ehrenbreitstein. Arnold's methods for financing his activities, which included tolls and credits, but also withheld money from other clerics, as well as the lack of diocesanal synods under his reign led to criticism by the cathedral chapter and other influential Trier clerics, who wrote an open letter that was publicly read in the cathedral on 10 February 1257. 

During Arnold's tenure, only one excommunication is documented, unlike the frequent use of excommunication under his predecessor. The Liebfrauenkirche and St. Maximin's Abbey were completed during his reign.
Arnold died in Montabaur in early November 1259 and is buried in Trier Cathedral, opposite of his predecessor.

References

Bibliography

 
 

 
 

Archbishops of Trier
13th-century Roman Catholic archbishops in the Holy Roman Empire
1259 deaths

Year of birth uncertain
12th-century births